Chris Birch may refer to:
 Chris Birch (stroke survivor)
 Chris Birch (game designer)
 Chris Birch (politician)